Fourier and related algebras occur naturally in the harmonic analysis of locally compact groups. They play an important role in the duality theories of these groups. The Fourier–Stieltjes algebra and the Fourier–Stieltjes transform on the Fourier algebra of a locally compact group were introduced by Pierre Eymard in 1964.

Definition

Informal
Let G be a locally compact abelian group, and Ĝ the dual group of G. Then  is the space of all functions on Ĝ which are integrable with respect to the Haar measure on Ĝ, and it has a Banach algebra structure where the product of two functions is convolution. We call  the Fourier algebra of G.

Similarly, we write  for the measure algebra on Ĝ, meaning the space of all finite regular Borel measures on Ĝ. We call  the Fourier-Stieltjes algebra of G. Equivalently,  can be defined as the linear span of the set  of continuous positive-definite functions on G.

Formal
Let  be a Fourier–Stieltjes algebra and  be a Fourier algebra such that the locally compact group  is abelian.

 

The space  of these functions is an algebra under pointwise multiplication is isomorphic to the measure algebra . This definition is still valid when  is not Abelian.

Helson–Kahane–Katznelson–Rudin theorem
Let A(G) be the Fourier algebra of a compact group G. Building upon the work of Wiener, Lévy, Gelfand, and Beurling, in 1959 Helson, Kahane, Katznelson, and Rudin proved that, when G is compact and abelian, a function f defined on a closed convex subset of the plane operates in A(G) if and only if f is real analytic. In 1969 Dunkl proved the result holds when G is compact and contains an infinite abelian subgroup.

References

 "Functions that Operate in the Fourier Algebra of a Compact Group" Charles F. Dunkl Proceedings of the American Mathematical Society, Vol. 21, No. 3. (Jun., 1969), pp. 540–544. Stable URL:
 "Functions which Operate in the Fourier Algebra of a Discrete Group" Leonede de Michele; Paolo M. Soardi, Proceedings of the American Mathematical Society, Vol. 45, No. 3. (Sep., 1974), pp. 389–392. Stable URL:
 "Uniform Closures of Fourier-Stieltjes Algebras", Ching Chou, Proceedings of the American Mathematical Society, Vol. 77, No. 1. (Oct., 1979), pp. 99–102.  Stable URL: 
 "Centralizers of the Fourier Algebra of an Amenable Group", P. F. Renaud, Proceedings of the American Mathematical Society, Vol. 32, No. 2. (Apr., 1972), pp. 539–542.  Stable URL: 

Harmonic analysis
Algebras